Mir Mahalleh may refer to:
 Mir Mahalleh, Fuman, Gilan Province
 Mir Mahalleh, alternate name of Maaf Mahalleh, Fuman County, Gilan Province
 Mir Mahalleh, Masal, Gilan Province
 Mir Mahalleh, Shanderman, Masal County, Gilan Province
 Mir Mahalleh, Shaft, Gilan Province
 Mir Mahalleh, Golestan